Naunton Beauchamp (pronounced 'Bo-schomp') is a village and is also a civil parish within Wychavon district in Worcestershire, England.  It is in the centre of the county, about four and a half miles from Pershore and nine miles from Worcester.

Naunton Beauchamp's church, St. Bartholomew C of E Church is a Grade II* listed building and it was listed on 11 February 1965.

References

External links 
 British Listed Buildings

Civil parishes in Worcestershire
Villages in Worcestershire
Wychavon